Odd Man Rush: A Harvard Kid's Hockey Odyssey from Central Park to Somewhere in Sweden—with Stops along the Way is a 2016 memoir by Bill Keenan in which Keenan recounts his experiences playing junior hockey, college hockey at Harvard, and professional hockey in minor leagues in Europe after injuries disrupted his dreams of an NHL career. At its publication, the book debuted as the #1 sports book on Amazon.com at which time it also broke into the top 100 books overall on the site.

Vanity Fair published an excerpt from the book on December 22, 2015.

In June 2019, Variety reported a film adaptation was underway with Howard Baldwin, once an NHL owner producing. The movie was released on September 1, 2020.

Notable people mentioned
Several notable players and other personnel are prominently mentioned in the book. The most prominent mentions include:

Jeremy Lin – Keenan's classmate at Harvard
Sidney Crosby – Keenan's youth hockey opponent
Ted Donato – Keenan's coach at Harvard
Paul Stewart – assistant coach at Harvard
Dylan Reese – Keenan's teammate at Harvard
Alex Killorn – Keenan's teammate at Harvard
Rob Schremp – Keenan's youth hockey teammate
Jonathan Quick – Keenan's youth hockey teammate
Mike Danton – Keenan's pro hockey opponent
Sean Backman – Keenan's youth hockey teammate
Mathias Lange – Keenan's junior hockey teammate
Matt Gilroy – Keenan's junior hockey teammate

Other notable individuals Keenan mentions meeting and/or playing against include Wayne Gretzky, Adam Graves, Sean Avery, Evgeni Malkin, Chris Drury, Rick DiPietro and George Plimpton.

See also
Ball Four
Odd Man Out: A Year on the Mound with a Minor League Misfit

References

2016 non-fiction books
Ice hockey books
Sports autobiographies
Skyhorse Publishing books